Sir Robert Graham (1744–1836) was an English judge.

Graham was a fellow of Trinity College, Cambridge and a member of the Inner Temple. He was attorney-general to George, Prince of Wales in 1793. He was knighted in 1800.

References

1744 births
1836 deaths
18th-century English judges
Fellows of Trinity College, Cambridge
Members of the Inner Temple
Members of the Privy Council of the United Kingdom
19th-century English judges